Kennebec is a small unincorporated community in southern Wake County, North Carolina, United States, along the border of Harnett County.  The community is situated along North Carolina Highway 55 and is the site of the Fuquay-Angier Airfield (Kennebec Flying Club). Much of the area has been recently annexed by the Harnett County town of Angier.  Kennebec was named for Kennebec County, Maine .  The community was also a stop on the former Durham and Southern Railway.

References

Unincorporated communities in Wake County, North Carolina
Unincorporated communities in North Carolina